Innergex Renewable Energy is a developer, owner and operator of run-of-river hydroelectric facilities, wind energy, and solar farms in North America, France and South America. While many of the firm's operational assets are located in its home province of Québec, it has expanded into Ontario, British Columbia, and Idaho, as well as Chile and France

Business segments
The company has four reportable segments: hydroelectric production, wind power production, solar power production, and site development and management. Through its energy production segments it sells electricity produced from its hydroelectric facilities, wind farms, and solar farms in operation to publicly owned entities. Through its site development and management segment, the company develops energy production facilities to the operational stage and then manages them.

Corporate history
Innergex Renewable Energy was founded in 1990 by Gilles Lefrançois under the name Innergex GP in response to the Québec government's call for private sector bids to develop small hydro generation facilities. The firm went on to develop four of its own projects (Saint-Paulin, Chaudière, Batawa and Pontneuf 1-2-3) and acquire another (Montmagny) before transferring these assets into the Innergex Renewable Energy Income Fund, which listed on the Toronto Stock Exchange in 2003.

In 2004, Innergex joined forces with TransCanada Corporation to bid on a Hydro-Québec call for tender for 1,000 MW of wind power. The two companies set up a joint venture, Cartier Wind Energy, with Innergex holding a 38% stake. In 2005, Cartier signed 20-year power purchase agreements for 739.5 MW to be generated at six locations on the Gaspé Peninsula. Five of the six projects were built between 2006 and 2012, including the 211.5 MW Gros-Morne Wind Farm, which became Canada's largest at the time of its commissioning, in late 2012.

In 2018 Innergex acquired Alterra Power Corporation, which made the company the largest independent renewable energy producer in British Columbia and among the largest in Canada.

In 2022 Innergex acquired what was left of Llaima Energía (50%) & Aela Energía the at the moment largest green energy provider in MW terms in Chile

Power projects controlled by Innergex Renewable Energy
Innergex currently operates 28 renewable energy generation facilities: 22 run-of-river hydro plants, five wind farms and one solar farm. These projects have a combined net capacity of 577 MW.

Operational power projects

See also

 Independent power producers in British Columbia

References

External links
 http://www.innergex.com/en

Electric power companies of Canada
Renewable energy companies of Canada
Companies based in Longueuil
Energy companies established in 1990
Renewable resource companies established in 1990
1990 establishments in Quebec
Companies listed on the Toronto Stock Exchange
Canadian companies established in 1990
Hydroelectric power stations in British Columbia
Run-of-the-river power stations